Gailly is a French surname that may refer to
Étienne Gailly (1922–1971), Belgian soldier and Olympic runner
Jean-loup Gailly, French computer programmer
Paul Gailly (1894–?), Belgian water polo player
Christian Gailly (1943–2013), French writer